The genus Pygoscelis ("rump-legged") contains three living species of penguins collectively known as "brush-tailed penguins".

Taxonomy
Mitochondrial and nuclear DNA evidence suggests the genus split from other penguins around 38 million years ago, about 2 million years after the ancestors of the genus Aptenodytes. In turn, the Adelie penguins split off from the other members of the genus around 19 million years ago.

Extant species

A 2020 study found that the gentoo penguin may actually comprise a species complex of 4 similar but genetically distinct species: the northern gentoo penguin (P. papua), the southern gentoo penguin (P. ellsworthi), the eastern gentoo penguin (P. taeniata), and the newly-described South Georgia gentoo penguin (P. poncetii). However, in 2021 the International Ornithological Congress recognized these as being subspecies of P. papua.

A study has estimated that there are about 3.79 million pairs of Adélie, 387,000 pairs of gentoo, and 8 million pairs of chinstrap penguins in their particular areas, making up 90% of Antarctic avian biomass (Black, C. E. 2016). 
Fossil species
 Pygoscelis grandis (Bahía Inglesa Formation, Late Miocene/Early Pliocene of Bahía Inglesa, Chile)
 Pygoscelis calderensis (Bahía Inglesa Formation, Late Miocene of Bahía Inglesa, Chile)
 Pygoscelis tyreei (Pliocene of New Zealand)

The latter two are tentatively assigned to this genus.

References

 
Bird genera
Penguins